Cuzznz is the collaborative studio album by American West Coast rappers Daz Dillinger and Snoop Dogg. It was released on January 15, 2016, by Felder Entertainment Inc. Cuzznz has guest appearances from Dâm-funk, Kurupt and Shon'Lawon.

Singles 
On April 11, 2014 "We'll Miss U" was released. This song is a Tribute for UNCLE JUNE BUG. produce by dj2high

The track "Sho You Right" was released on SoundCloud on October 26, 2015. The song was produced by Dâm-funk.

"Best Friend" was leaked via SoundCloud on December 3, 2015, and released along with the pre-order of the album on same day. It was officially released as the album's first single. The song was produced by kjconteh.

On January 14, 2016, "N My Life Tyme" was released. The song was produced by Dâm-funk.

Track listing

See also
 2016 in hip hop music

References

2016 albums
Daz Dillinger albums
Snoop Dogg albums
Collaborative albums

Albums produced by Daz Dillinger